Dozie Kanu is an American artist. His work involves sculptural objects and installations that deal with limits of form, materiality, functionality and utilitarianism.

Early life and education 

Kanu was born in Houston, Texas in 1993 and his parents are both Nigerian immigrants. After studying film directing, Kanu received a bachelor of fine arts degree from School of Visual Arts, New York in 2016. His first museum solo exhibition was held at the Studio Museum in Harlem in 2019. He presently lives and works in Portugal.

Solo exhibitions

2022 
Galerie Francesca Pia, Zurich, CH

Cordyceps Gaud Adversary, Neuer Essener Kunstverein, Essen, DE

Tinted Spirit, Project Native Informant, London, UK

2021 
Blood Type, Performance Space New York City, NY

to prop and ignore, Manual Arts, Los Angeles, CA

value order [gentrify.pt], Galeria Madragoa, Lisbon, PT

2020 
Recoil, International Waters (with Cudelice Brazelton IV), New York, NY

Owe Deed, One Deep, Project Native Informant, London, UK

2019 
FUNCTION, The Studio Museum in Harlem, New York, NY

ARS JUS PAX, JTG Detroit Project, Detroit, MI

2018 
Humane Alternatives, Soft Opening, London, UK

References

External links 
 Official Website of Dozie Kanu

1993 births
Living people